William Laranas (born 12 December 1978 in Davao City) is a Filipino director and cinematographer.

Biography

Early life

Laranas studied filmmaking at the Mowelfund Film Institute and is currently a professor of Cinematography at the Ateneo de Manila University.

Filmography
 Balahibong Pusa (2001, English: Cat Hairs)
 Radyo (2001, English: Radio)
 Ikaw Lamang Hanggang Ngayon (2002, English: Only You)
 Hibla (2002, English: Thread)
 Sigaw (2004, English: The Echo)
 The Echo (2008, English language remake of Sigaw)
 Patient X (2009)
 The Road (2011)
 Abomination (2018)
 Aurora (2018)
Nightshift (2019)
Death of a Girlfriend (2021)
Greed (2022)
Laruan (2022)

References

External links
 

Living people
1978 births
People from Davao City
Artists from Davao del Sur
Horror film directors
Filipino film directors
Filipino television directors